Hyperthaema sordida is a moth of the subfamily Arctiinae. It was described by Walter Rothschild in 1935. It is found in the Brazilian state of Santa Catarina.

References

Phaegopterina
Moths described in 1935